The Suzuki Boulevard range of motorcycles includes:
 Suzuki Boulevard C109R
 Suzuki Boulevard C90
 Suzuki Boulevard C50
 Suzuki Boulevard M109R
 Suzuki Boulevard M90
 Suzuki Boulevard M50
 Suzuki Boulevard S40
 Suzuki Boulevard S50
 Suzuki Boulevard S83